In Reformed theology, the Lord's Supper or Eucharist is a sacrament that spiritually nourishes Christians and strengthens their union with Christ. The outward or physical action of the sacrament is eating bread and drinking wine. Reformed confessions, which are official statements of the beliefs of Reformed churches, teach that Christ's body and blood are really present in the sacrament, and that believers receive, in the words of the Belgic Confession, "the proper and natural body and the proper blood of Christ." The primary difference between the Reformed doctrine and that of Catholic and Lutheran Christians is that for the Reformed, this presence is believed to be communicated in a spiritual manner rather than by his body being physically eaten.

Early Reformed theologians such as John Calvin and Huldrych Zwingli rejected the Roman Catholic belief in transubstantiation, that the bread and wine of the Eucharist change into Christ's body and blood, but taught that Christ's person, including his body and blood, are presented to Christians who partake of it in faith. They also disagree with Martin Luther and the Lutheran tradition which taught that Christ's body is physically eaten with the mouth in the sacrament. Later Reformed orthodox theologians continued to teach views similar to that of Calvin and Zwingli. In the modern period, Karl Barth espoused a symbolic view that the sacrament only communicates God's promises rather than functioning to actually confer these promises. Other Reformed theologians continued to teach the traditional view.

History

Background
From the beginning of Christianity through the tenth century, Christian theologians saw the Eucharist as the church's participation in Christ's sacrifice. Christ was believed to be present in the Eucharist, but there were differences over the way in which this occurred. 

Reformed theologian John Riggs has argued that the School of Antioch in the Eastern Roman Empire, along with Hilary of Poitiers and Ambrose in the Western Roman Empire, taught a realist, metabolic, or somatic view, where the elements of the Eucharist were believed to be changed into Christ's body and blood. Riggs maintains that the influential fourth-century Western theologian Augustine of Hippo, on the other hand, held that Christ is really present in the elements of the Eucharist, but not in a bodily manner, because his body remains in heaven. Riggs argues that Augustine believed the Eucharist is a spiritual eating which allows Christians to become part of Christ's body. Western theologians in the three centuries following Augustine did not elaborate on the way Christ is present in the Eucharist, but emphasized the transforming power of the sacrament.

According to Riggs, in the ninth century, Hrabanus Maurus and Ratramnus also defended Augustine's view of nonmetabolic real presence. During the high and late Middle Ages, the metabolic view became increasingly dominant to the exclusion of the nonmetabolic view, to the point that it was considered the only orthodox option. The doctrine of transubstantiation was developed in the high Middle Ages to explain the change of the elements into Christ's body and blood. Transubstantiation is the belief that the Eucharistic elements are transformed into Christ's body and blood in a way only perceivable by the intellect, not by the senses.

Anglican theologian Brian Douglas maintains that "Augustine is clear, nonetheless, in his use of realism and argues that the presence of Christ in the Eucharist is real such that the bread and wine and their offering participate in a real way in the eternal and heavenly Forms of Christ's body and blood."

Berengar of Tours also had an Eucharist view very similar to Calvin, and such views were common in the early Ango-Saxon church, as can be seen in the writings of Aelfric of Eynsham.

Reformation

Martin Luther, leading figure of the Protestant Reformation and leader of the Protestant movement which would be called Lutheranism, rejected the doctrine of transubstantiation, but continued to hold that Christ is bodily present "under the bread and wine". Luther insisted that Christ's words during the institution of the sacrament, "this is my body", be taken literally. He believed that anyone who ate and drank during the Eucharist (often called the "Lord's Supper" by Protestants) physically ate Christ's body and drank his blood, regardless of their faith.

Huldrych Zwingli, the first theologian in the Reformed tradition, also rejected the view of transubstantiation, but he disagreed with Luther by holding that Christ's body is not physically present in the Eucharist. He held that Christ's whole person (body and spirit) is presented to believers in the Eucharist, but that this does not occur by Christ's body being eaten with the mouth. This view has been labeled "mystical real presence", meaning that those who partake have a direct experience of God's presence, or "spiritual real presence" because Christ's presence is by his spirit. Zwingli also did not believe that the sacrament actually confers the grace which is offered in the sacrament, but that the outer signs of bread and wine testify to that grace and awaken the memory of Christ's death.

John Calvin, a very influential early Reformed theologian, believed the Lord's Supper fed Christians with the spiritual food of union with Christ. He believed that in the Supper Christians feed on Christ's flesh, which he saw as an inexplicable miracle. Calvin taught that the Supper confirms the promises communicated to Christians in the preaching of the Gospel. He also saw its purpose as provoking praise for God and love for other people. He believed it necessary for Christians to partake of Christ's humanity in the Supper as well as his Spirit, and that the bread and wine really present, rather than simply symbolize or represent, Christ's body and blood. Calvin spoke of the communication involved in the Lord's Supper as spiritual, meaning that it originates in the Holy Spirit. Calvin's teaching on the Lord's Supper was followed by many others in the Reformed tradition, including Martin Bucer and Peter Martyr Vermigli. Calvin, like Zwingli and against Luther, did not believe that Christ is bodily present in the elements of the Eucharist. He taught that Christ remains in heaven and that we commune with him in the Lord's Supper by being raised up to him rather than him descending to us. Calvin believed the elements of the Supper to be used by God as instruments in communicating the promises which they represent, a view called symbolic instrumentalism.

Heinrich Bullinger, Zwingli's successor, went beyond Zwingli by teaching that there is a union between the sacrament of the Supper and the grace symbolized in them. Bullinger's view was not identical to Calvin's, because he did not see sacraments as instrumental in communicating grace. Bullinger's view has been called "symbolic parallelism", because the inward feeding on Christ occurs at the same time as the outward eating of bread and wine, but is not caused by it in any way.

The Reformed confessions of faith, official statements of the beliefs of Reformed churches, followed the view that Christ is really present in the Supper. They either took Calvin's view that the signs of bread and wine are instrumental in communicating grace, or Bullinger's symbolic parallelism. Some of the German-language Reformed confessions seem hesitant to make the sacrament a means of grace, but they all maintain that there is a union between the outward signs of the sacrament and the inward grace signified. Reformed orthodox theologians also continued to insist on Christ's real presence in the Supper, while denying against Lutherans that his body is locally present.

Modern
The influential eighteenth-century Reformed theologian Friedrich Schleiermacher saw problems with all of the Reformation positions on Christ's presence in the Eucharist, and hoped that a new articulation of the doctrine would be made. He emphasized the function of the Supper of confirming Christians' union with Christ as well as the union they have with one another.

In the nineteenth century, the doctrine of the Lord's Supper became a point of controversy between American Reformed theologians John Williamson Nevin and Charles Hodge. Nevin, influenced by German Lutheran Isaak August Dorner, wrote that through the Lord's Supper, Christians are mystically united to Christ's whole person, and that this union is through Christ's flesh. Hodge thought that Nevin overemphasized the idea of mystical union and argued that when Christians are said to commune with Christ in the Supper, it is Christ's virtue as a sacrifice for their sins which is meant rather than a mystical union with his flesh. Hodge also taught that nothing is communicated in the Lord's Supper which is not communicated in the preaching of God's word. American Presbyterians generally agreed with Hodge. Nineteenth-century Reformed Congregationalist followers of the New England theology generally held a symbolic, memorial view of the Lord's Supper.

Twentieth-century Reformed theologian Karl Barth did not follow the Reformed belief that sacraments are used by God as means of grace. Instead, he saw the Lord's Supper as purely symbolic and functioning to proclaim God's promises. His position has been called symbolic memorialism because he saw the sacraments function as memorializing Christ's death. Another twentieth-century Reformed theologian, Donald Baillie, took a position similar to that of John Calvin. Baillie argued that though God is omnipresent, he is present in a special way in the Lord's Supper because he is present by virtue of the believer's faith. Christ's presence is even more real to the believer in the sacrament than is physical reality.

Meaning

In the Reformed confessions, the Lord's Supper is a meal that provides spiritual nourishment. Eating the body and drinking the blood of Christ in the sacrament is believed to spiritually strengthen Christians. Believers are already believed to be united with Christ, but the Supper serves to deepen and strengthen this union. The Supper is also a way to commemorate and proclaim the death and resurrection of Christ. Partakers are to express gratitude and praise to God in thanks for his death and the benefits it provides. The Supper is believed to assure Christians of their salvation and union with Christ, which has been communicated to them in the preaching of the gospel. The Supper is also believed to enhance Christians' union with one another. It calls Christians to love and obey Christ, and to live in harmony with other Christians.

Reformed confessions reject the Catholic doctrine that the Eucharist is a sacrifice of propitiation, or sacrifice to satisfy God's wrath and attain forgiveness of sins. Instead, they teach that Christ's body is only to be received, not re-presented to God as a sacrifice. The confessions do sometimes speak of the Supper as a sacrifice of thanksgiving for the gift of propitiation which has been received. In the twentieth century, Scottish Reformed theologian T. F. Torrance developed a strong doctrine of Eucharistic sacrifice. He argued that Christ's person and work could not be separated, and that the Eucharist mediated his sacrificial death.

In Reformed churches, only believing Christians are expected to partake of the Lord's Supper. Further, partakers are expected to examine and prepare themselves for the sacrament. This involves determining whether one acknowledges their sinfulness and has faith in Christ to forgive them. Christians may have some degree of doubt regarding their salvation, but they are at least to be aware of their sin and have a desire to have faith.

Christ's presence

The Reformed confessions teach that Christ's true body and blood are really present in the Lord's Supper. Regarding what is received in the Supper, the Reformed tradition does not disagree with the position of Catholicism or Lutheranism. Reformed confessions teach that partakers of the Supper, in the words of the Belgic Confession, partake of "the proper and natural body and the proper blood of Christ". However, they deny the explanations for this eating and drinking made by Lutherans and Catholics. Against Catholics, Reformed confessions teach that the bread and wine of the Supper do not become the blood and body of Christ, as in the Catholic view of transubstantiation. Against Lutherans, Reformed confessions do not teach that partakers of the Supper eat Christ's body and drink his blood with their mouths. While Reformed confessions teach that in the Supper Christ is received in both his divine and human natures, the manner of eating is believed to be spiritual. The body and blood of Christ remain fleshly substance, but they are communicated to the partaker in a spiritual manner.

See also

Anglican eucharistic theology
Receptionism
Reformed baptismal theology

References

Bibliography

Calvinist theology
Eucharist